Patric Niederhauser (born 8 October 1991 in Münsingen) is a professional racing driver from Switzerland and a current Audi Factory Driver. He was the champion of the Formula Abarth Italian Series.

Career

Karting
Niederhauser began karting in 2006 and raced primarily in his native Switzerland for the majority of his career, working his way up from the junior ranks to progress through to the KF2 category by 2009, when he finished as runner-up in Swiss Karting Championship.

Formula Abarth
In 2010, Niederhauser graduated to single–seaters, racing in the newly launched Formula Abarth series in Italy for Jenzer Motorsport. Race victory at Varano and another five podiums at the end of the season saw him finish as runner-up in the Italian series, Niederhauser remained in Formula Abarth for a second season in 2011, when the series split in European and Italian series. He won the Italian Series title in clash with teammate (till Spa round) Sergey Sirotkin, taking six wins in fourteen races. In European Series the Swiss driver finished as runner-up with five race victories, 37 points behind Sirotkin.

Formula Renault
During the 2010 Niederhauser also contested a single round of the Formula Renault 2.0 Middle European Championship at Dijon, finishing on podium in both races.

GP3 Series
In 2012 Niederhauser will continue his collaboration with Jenzer Motorsport into GP3 Series.

Audi factory driver
In line with his factory duties, Niederhauser joined customer team Saintéloc Racing for the 2023 GT World Challenge Europe season. He joined fellow factory drivers Simon Gachet and Christopher Mies for a Pro entry in the Endurance Cup, and added a Sprint Cup campaign alongside Erwan Bastard.

Personal life
Patric Niederhauser is in a relationship with racing driver Marylin Niederhauser who competed in the ADAC Formula 4 Championship. The fact that the two have identical surnames is a coincidence.

Racing record

Career summary

† As Niederhauser was a guest driver, he was ineligible to score points.
* Season still in progress.

Complete GP3 Series results
(key) (Races in bold indicate pole position) (Races in italics indicate fastest lap)

24 Hours of Le Mans results

Complete GP2 Series results
(key) (Races in bold indicate pole position) (Races in italics indicate fastest lap)

Complete GT World Challenge Europe Sprint Cup results

References

External links
 Career details from Driver Database
 Official website

1991 births
Living people
Swiss racing drivers
Formula Abarth drivers
Formula Renault 2.0 Alps drivers
Italian Formula Three Championship drivers
Swiss GP3 Series drivers
GP2 Series drivers
European Le Mans Series drivers
24 Hours of Le Mans drivers
FIA World Endurance Championship drivers
ADAC GT Masters drivers
People from Münsingen
Arden International drivers
Sportspeople from the canton of Bern
Blancpain Endurance Series drivers
FIA Motorsport Games drivers
International GT Open drivers
Audi Sport drivers
Target Racing drivers
Jenzer Motorsport drivers
BVM Racing drivers
Team Lazarus drivers
Phoenix Racing drivers
Nürburgring 24 Hours drivers
Saintéloc Racing drivers
24H Series drivers
GT4 European Series drivers